The 11th Asian Film Awards are the 2017 edition of the Asian Film Awards. The ceremony was held on March 21, 2017 at the Cultural Centre in Hong Kong.

Winners and nominees

References

External links

Asian Film Awards ceremonies
2017 film awards
2017 in Hong Kong
Film
Hong Kong